Amanda Lightfoot (born 30 January 1987) is a British biathlete who competes in the IBU Cup. 

Lightfoot was born in Coventry. She took up the sport after first learning to ski at the age of nineteen. She is a Sergeant clerk in the Adjutant General's Corps. She was selected as part of the Team GB squad for the 2014 Winter Olympics in Sochi. Her trainer is Walter Pichler. Lightfoot achieved a new personal best at the 2017 Biathlon World Championships in Hochfilzen when she finished 32nd in the individual race.

References

External links 

 
 
 
 
 

1987 births
Living people
Sportspeople from Coventry
English female biathletes
Biathletes at the 2014 Winter Olympics
Biathletes at the 2018 Winter Olympics
Olympic biathletes of Great Britain
Adjutant General's Corps soldiers